Huaping Islet, Taiwanese Hokkien: is an  high island in Zhongzheng District, Keelung, Taiwan located in the East China Sea. 'Pyroxene and andesite are the major rock types of the islet. The entire islet is covered with metallic volcanic debris which has turned purplish red (bordeaux), purple, green, brass (yellowish) and iron grey after oxidation.' Along with the nearby Pengjia Islet and Mianhua Islet, Huaping Islet is considered of strategic importance to Taiwan.

Name
Huaping Islet, Taiwanese Hokkien: is also known as Kangjiao Yu ('sedan islet'), Hua-pʻing Hsü, Kahei-sho, Huaping Yu, and Pinnacle Island.

History
In his 1868 book Rambles of a Naturalist on the Shores and Waters of the China Sea, Cuthbert Collingwood (naturalist) briefly described Huaping Islet, called Pinnacle Island or Chair-bearers:

In his 1895 book From Far Formosa, George Leslie Mackay briefly described Huaping Islet (literally, 'flower pot islet'), also known as Pinnacle Island:

On March 18, 1996, the Mianhua Islet and Huaping Islet Wildlife Preservation Area was established.

Due to the effects of Typhoon Maria (2018), part of the middle of the island crumbled off. The earlier single-humped camel shape became more like the shape of a double-humped camel.

On October 28, 2019, the ship Hsieh-chien 168 was sunk after striking rocks in the waters near Huaping Islet.

Gallery

See also
 List of islands of Taiwan
 List of islands in the East China Sea

References

External links
 2018 8 8台語i會通.風颱掃過! 基隆"花矸嶼"單峰變雙峰駱駝 ('8 Aug 2018 I can use Taiwanese. Typhoon sweeps by! Keelung's Huaping Islet Changed from a Single-humped Camel to a Double-humped Camel') 

Islands of Taiwan
Islands of the East China Sea
Landforms of Keelung